Amsterdam Express is an Albanian drama film directed by Fatmir Koçi.

Plot
A young Albanian emigrant is precariously caught in Amsterdam among the promise and allure of the rich city, threats of ruthless Albanian drug dealers & sex traffickers and his white marriage with a Dutch girl. At the heart of this lies a true love in his poor and backward country. 
Bekim, 30, will do anything to make fast money. He instead, returns to his country empty handed after giving up his last Euros to save a young girl at the windows of the red light district.

Cast
 James Biberi as Van Doom
 Blerim Destani as Bekim
 Flonja Kodheli as Marta 
 Bujar Lako as Selim
 Rajmonda Bulku as Vjollca
 Carolien Spoor as Suzanna 
 Natasha Goulden as Anna
 Renne Gjoni as Grijs
 Victoria Mirovaya as Junkie Girl
 Gert Ferra as Roni
 Dritan Kastrati as Deki
 Olta Gixhari as Dora
 Irena Mecaj as Albana
 Laert Pasko as Tuki
 Lykele Muus as Johan
 Gjenovefa Redhi as Shqipe
 Vasian Lami as Elezi

Release
Amsterdam Express was released in Albania on the 27 March 2014.

References

External links

2014 films
English-language Albanian films
Albanian-language films
2014 drama films
Albanian drama films